I Wish I Was Eighteen Again is the first album by George Burns, released in 1980.

The album peaked at No. 93 on Billboards Top LPs & Tape chart. The title track is Burns' only Billboard Hot 100 and Adult Contemporary entry.

Track listing

Personnel
Production
Producer: Jerry Kennedy
Engineers: Brent King, Carla Frederick, Mike Psanos
Photography: Gary Heery

Charts
Album

Singles

References

External links

1980 albums
RCA Records albums
George Burns albums